Boloco (from Boston Local Company) is the brand name of an American chain of restaurants 
founded in 1996.

History 
The company was incorporated under the name The Wrap by co-founders Adam Liebman, Gregg Harris, John Pepper and Jason Hutchinson. In 1997, it opened its first restaurant, initially called "Under Wraps", in Boston's Back Bay neighborhood (Massachusetts Avenue at Boylston Street). In 1998, the company acquired a competing restaurant business with locations in Harvard Square and Cleveland Circle. All three locations were re-branded under the new name, "The Wrap and Smoothie Bar" (selected via a customer contest in late 1997). In 2000, they merged with a four-unit juice company called "Jera's Juice". In the next few years, the company added restaurants at Northeastern University and on Newbury Street (2000), Children's Hospital and Pearl Street (2003), Federal Street in Boston's Financial District and in Hanover, New Hampshire, at Dartmouth College (2004). Jera's Juice was phased out by 2003, although a version of its swirl logo was incorporated into the Boloco logo.

Late in 2004, the founders decided to expand The Wrap beyond New England. They sold The Wrap brand and its intangible assets to a group of Ohio-based entrepreneurs, Nicar Enterprises, which had built national franchise organizations.  In 2005, both parties helped re-brand The Wrap as Boloco. The founders changed the name mainly because the word "wrap" had come to mean something that was typically served cold and prepackaged, whereas The Wrap's offerings used hot, grilled, fresh ingredients wrapped in steamed tortillas — more like a burrito, less like a wrap. The name The Wrap was also too generic to be protected legally.

Nicar built eight locations across the U.S. In late 2006, the Boston-based founders repurchased all of the sold assets and renamed the franchised locations "Currito".  As of May 2010, Currito has 12 franchised units in nine states. Currito and Boloco have some similar menu items and trade dress left over from the 2-year relationship, but operate independently.

Between 2005 and 2007, the company opened six stores in the Boston area as well as Concord, New Hampshire and Burlington, Vermont.

In 2007, the company became one of the first fast-casual chains to gain Certified Green status with the Green Restaurant Association. Boloco meats and chicken are grass- or vegetarian-fed and free of antibiotics and added growth hormones.  It also serves organic tofu. In 2007, Boloco announced that it would use only free-range eggs. In 2008, the company ceased using Styrofoam, substituting corn-based smoothie cups and compostable bowls.

In 2007, a controlling stake in the company was sold to Winona Capital Management, who planned to have 66 locations by 2016. The peak number of locations was 22, in 2014, but the company was losing about $3 million per year. In 2014, the New York Times reported that Boloco was "one of the handful of restaurant chains that deliberately pay well above the federal minimum wage."

Founder John Pepper (who had been bought out of control in 2007) had left the company in 2013 after a disagreement with the board of directors over a $15 million investment deal.  He returned in 2015 as interim CEO, with other cofounders buying control back from Winona Capital Management and led a return to profitability by selling eight restaurants (five went to B. Good, another local restaurant chain founded by a former Boloco employee) and reducing the size of corporate management. Autumn of 2016 saw major changes. Boloco closed numerous locations, including the one in Vermont and all the ones in Maryland.  By November 2016, they were down to only ten locations in Massachusetts, one in Rhode Island and one in Hanover, NH.

Boloco became a certified B Corp in 2016. The Harvard Square location closed in July 2017, after 19 and a half years of operation.

References

External links
Official site

Economy of the Northeastern United States
Regional restaurant chains in the United States
Restaurants in Massachusetts
Restaurants established in 1996
Fast casual restaurants
1996 establishments in Massachusetts
B Lab-certified corporations